The New Design Series (NDS) was the name used to refer to banknotes of the Philippine peso issued from 1985 to 2013; it was also known as the BSP Series when the Bangko Sentral ng Pilipinas was established in 1993. The coins, however, were issued from 1995 to 2017. It was succeeded by the New Generation Currency (NGC) Series issued on December 16, 2010, for banknotes and November 30, 2017, for coins. The NDS/BSP banknotes were printed until 2013 (with 5-peso note were printed until 1995, 10-peso note until 2001, 20 and 1000 peso notes until 2012, and 50, 100, 200 and 500 peso notes until 2013), legal tender until December 31, 2015, and can be exchanged with NGC notes until its demonetization on December 29, 2017, where they co-existed with the NGC banknotes from December 16, 2010, to December 29, 2017.

The NDS/BSP notes were no longer legal tender since January 1, 2016 and demonetized one year later on December 29, 2017 (with the demonetization of the NDS/BSP notes were originally scheduled by January 1, 2017, but the deadline of exchange of NDS/BSP notes to NGC notes was extended to July 1, 2017, after the Bangko Sentral ng Pilipinas approved the extension due to public clamor, and extended again to the final demonetization date of NDS/BSP series notes on December 29, 2017, after BSP decided to extend its time limit due to Filipino consumers presenting the notes after that date). The coins however, still remain legal tender with the new NGC coins as of 2020.

Banknotes

Released or circulated

Unreleased

Design of the banknotes

5-peso banknote
The 5-peso note designed by Romeo Mananquil was issued by the Central Bank on June 12, 1985.

The banknote was predominantly colored green.

The obverse of the 5-peso banknote featured the portrait of Emilio Aguinaldo. Along the right side of the banknote was the NHCP historical marker in the Malolos Cathedral (indicating the foundation of the First Philippine Republic, which Aguinaldo became its president) along with a cannon. The reverse of the banknote featured a depiction of the Philippine declaration of independence by Emilio Aguinaldo on June 12, 1898.

Security features of the banknote included a security thread, scattered red & blue visible fibers, and fluorescent printing.

The Bangko Sentral ng Pilipinas has stopped printing this banknote in 1995, and it has been replaced by an equivalent coin that was introduced in the same year.

10-peso banknote
The 10-peso banknote designed by Rafael Asuncion was issued on July 1985, a month after the 5-peso banknote was issued.

The banknote was predominantly colored brown.

The obverse side of the 10-peso banknote featured Apolinario Mabini on the left and Andrés Bonifacio on the right. Bonifacio was the founder of the Katipunan (KKK), a secret society established to fight the Spanish colonial government. Mabini was the Philippines' first Prime Minister and Secretary of Foreign Affairs. Depicted on the right side was one of the flags of the Katipunan (see Flags of the Philippine Revolution), the Kartilya ng Katipunan, and a letter written by Mabini.

The reverse side of the banknote featured the Barasoain Church in Malolos, Bulacan, site of the first Philippine Congress and where the Malolos Constitution was drafted. The right portion depicted the initiation rites of the Katipunan. Members accepted into the society had to sign their name on the society's roster using their own blood. The design was previously used on the 5-peso  "Pilipino" and "Ang Bagong Lipunan" notes.

From its introduction in July 1985 until May 2, 1997, the 10-peso banknote only depicted Mabini and the Barasoain Church. In recent years, the banknote has since been replaced with a bi-metallic 10-peso coin also bearing the effigies of Bonifacio and Mabini.

The Bangko Sentral ng Pilipinas has stopped printing this banknote in 2001, and it has been replaced by an equivalent coin that was introduced in 2000, one year before the banknote's last printing year in 2001.

20-peso banknote
The 20 peso bill was designed by Angel Cacnio. The obverse side of the 20-peso banknote featured Manuel L. Quezon, first president of the Commonwealth of the Philippines. Along the right side of the banknote was the coat-of-arms of the Commonwealth, and two of Quezon's notable accomplishments. The first was "Wikang Pambansâ", which is Tagalog for "national language". In 1937, the National Language Institute was founded to establish a single national language for the Philippines. This eventually became the Filipino language,  which is largely based on Tagalog. The second was the "Saligang Batas 1935" or the 1935 Constitution of the Philippines. This was the first real constitution that was nationally effected and large parts of it survive in the current constitution.

The banknote was predominantly colored orange.

The reverse side of the 20-peso banknote depicted Malacañan Palace, more popularly known as Malacañang, the residence of the President of the Philippines, along the banks of the Pasig River. Quezon was the first Philippine president to live in the Palace.

50-peso banknote
Depicted on the front side of the fifty-peso was Sergio Osmeña, the second president of the Commonwealth of the Philippines. He served as president from 1944, after Quezon's death, to 1946, when the United States granted the Philippines' independence.

The banknote was predominantly colored red and was designed by Rafael Asuncion.

The National Museum was featured on the reverse side of the banknote. This building used to be the Legislative Building, where the House of Representatives that Osmena presided over as Speaker from 1907 to 1922 was located. The building and then renamed Executive House during the Martial Law period and was labeled as such in the fifty-peso banknote until recently.

100-peso banknote
The front side of the 100-peso banknote featured Manuel Roxas, the first president of the independent Philippine Republic. This independence was shown at the right side where the Philippine flag was raised while the flag of the United States was lowered on July 4, 1946.

The banknote was predominantly colored violet and was designed by Angel Cacnio.

The reverse side of the banknote depicted the Manila compound of the Bangko Sentral.

The 100-peso banknote was the smallest-valued banknote to have the new security features implemented in recent years. But before the advent of the new security features, the 100-peso banknote was interesting for having other security features. On the front side was a barely visible "100" logo above the signatures of the president and the Central Bank governor. This logo was best seen on crisp new 100-peso banknotes. On the reverse side, the top row of windows of the main building had the words "Bangko Sentral ng Pilipinas" ("Central Bank of the Philippines") running the whole length.

The 100-peso banknote became the subject of controversy after banknotes printed in France in time for the Christmas season were printed with the President's name misspelled, the first in Philippine history.  The banknotes, of which a small amount were still in circulation and were legal tender until 2015, spelled the President's name as "Gloria Macapagal-Arrovo" versus the correct Gloria Macapagal Arroyo. The incident was subsequently the subject of public humor as soon as the issue made national headlines. The BSP probed the mistake and corrected the error afterwards.

200-peso banknote
The front side of the 200-peso banknote featured the portrait of Diosdado Macapagal. It also featured the Aguinaldo Shrine in Kawit, Cavite.

The back side of the banknote featured a scene from EDSA II, with Gloria Macapagal Arroyo, Macapagal's daughter, being sworn in as president by Chief Justice Hilario Davide, Jr. in January 2001. The little girl holding a Bible in between Arroyo and Davide is Cecilia Paz Razon Abad, daughter of Philippine Budget and Management Secretary Florencio Abad and Batanes Representative Henedina Razon-Abad.

The banknote was predominantly colored green.  This note was also a commemorative banknote, released in 2002 to commemorate Philippine independence.

The banknote was the subject of criticism by the opposition.  They said that the legal tender should only feature deceased national heroes and not an incumbent president.  Although, it wasn't the first time that a legal tender featured a sitting president.  Legal tender coinage was minted to commemorate the inauguration of Manuel L. Quezon as President of the Philippines in 1935. Emergency currency during World War II had many instances where provincial emergency currency boards placed the image of then President Manuel L. Quezon. In 1975, Bangko Sentral ng Pilipinas released a 5-peso coin featuring the face of then President Ferdinand Marcos.  Former presidents Fidel Ramos and Joseph Estrada was also pictured in a limited commemorative 2000-peso banknote that honors the 100-year celebration of Philippine Independence. Also a limited commemorative gold 1000-peso banknote with the picture of former President Joseph Estrada was also issued to honor the 100-year celebration of Philippine Independence. Also, every banknote series since 1935 has borne the facsimile signature of the incumbent President of the Philippines.

Some critics including Father Robert Reyes also pointed out that featuring Gloria Arroyo in the 200-peso note could be an electioneering tactic ahead of the 2004 Philippine elections.

500-peso banknote
The front side of the 500-peso banknote featured the portrait of Benigno Aquino Jr. To the right of the banknote, there were two popular quotes from Aquino: "Faith in our people and faith in God" (which is located above the signature of the Philippine president), and "The Filipino is worth dying for", under which was signed his nickname, "Ninoy". There was also the signature of Aquino, a typewriter with his initials ("B.S.A.J."), and a dove of peace.  A Philippine flag was also to the right of his portrait, near the central part of the front side.

The reverse side featured a collage of various images in relation to Aquino.  He was (in front of an article about "1st Cav", out of some of the pictures) a journalist for the Manila Times, a senator (the pioneer of the Study Now, Pay Later education program), the mayor in his hometown of Concepcion, the governor of Tarlac, and was the main driving force behind the People Power Revolution of 1986, some three years after his death in 1983.

The banknote was predominantly colored yellow.

It was also interesting to note that unlike the names of the figures on the bills, "Benigno S. Aquino, Jr." was written in gold-colored, cursive writing with a green laurel wreath as opposed to the name being simply written as with the other banknotes.

Before this note was printed, the 500-peso banknote designed by Romeo Mananquil was to feature Ferdinand Marcos and was its reverse was to be the Batasang Pambansa Complex. The People Power Revolution caused it to be replaced by the current 500-peso banknote. Remnants of this version of the banknote were only for media purposes.

On August 16, 2009, a proposal was made by the Bangko Sentral ng Pilipinas  to have former President Cory Aquino accompany her husband, Ninoy Aquino on the banknote. The new design was included in the 500-peso NGC note.

1,000-peso banknote
The front side of the 1,000-peso banknote featured the portraits of José Abad Santos, Chief Justice;  Josefa Llanes Escoda, civic worker and one of the founders of the Girl Scouts of the Philippines;  and Vicente Lim, a general in the Philippine Army, first Filipino graduate of West Point: the three are considered heroes of the resistance against the Japanese occupation of the Philippines.  It also featured the eternal flame, laurel leaves, and Bangko Sentral ng Pilipinas (BSP) logo.

The back of the banknote featured the Banaue Rice Terraces, Manunggul Jar cover and Langgal.

The banknote was predominantly colored blue and was designed by Romeo Mananquil.

Security features of the banknote included optically variable ink, a security thread, scattered red & blue visible fibers, and fluorescent printing. The words "Central Bank of the Philippines" were microprinted in the lower left border on the face of the note.

Coins

References

Banknotes of the Philippines
Philippines currency history
Portraits on banknotes